Silphium mohrii, known by the common names Mohr's rosinweed and shaggy rosinweed, is a species of  flowering plant in the family Asteraceae. It is native to the Southeastern United States, where it is native only to northern Alabama, southern Tennessee, and extreme northwest Georgia. It is native to prairie remnants and rocky limestone openings. Because of its restricted range and severely declined habitat, it is considered a vulnerable species.

It produces heads of yellow flowers in late summer.

References

mohrii